The 2018 Florida House of Representatives election was held in the U.S. state of Florida on November 6, 2018, to elect members to the House of Representatives. The election coincided with the election for governor, and other elections. The Republicans won 73 seats and losing only 2, maintaining their control since 1997, while the Democrats gained 6 seats. Four vacant seats, all won by Republicans in 2016, were picked up by Democrats.

Results

Closest races 
Seats where the margin of victory was under 10%:
 
  gain
 
 
 
 
 
  gain
 
 
   
 
  
 
 
  gain
 
 
  
  gain
  gain

Retiring incumbents

Republicans
Clay Ingram district 1 (term limited)
Frank White district 2 (retiring, ran for Fl Att gen)
Elizabeth porter district 10 (term limited)
Jay Fant District 15 (retiring, ran for FL Att Gen)
Jason Brodeur district 28 (term limited)
Jay Metz district 32 (term limited, appointed to 5th judicial circuit court)
Don Hahnfeldt district 33 (deceased)
Richard Corcoran district 37 (term limited)
Mike Miller district 47 (retiring, ran for CD-7)
Tom Goodson district 51 (term limited)
Ben Albritton district 56 (term limited ran for SD-26)
Jake Rayburn district 57 (retiring)
Ross Spano District 59 (retiring ran for CD-15)
Larry Alhern District 66 (term limited, ran Pinellas Co. Commission district 6)
Kathleen Peters District 69 (retiring, ran for Pinellas Co. commission district 6)
Jim Boyd district 71 (term limited)
Joe Gruters district 73 (retiring, ran for SD-23)
Julio Gonzalez district 74 (retiring, ran for CD-17)
Matt Caldwell District 79 (term limited, ran for Agricultural commissioner)
Gayle Harrell District 83 (term limited, ran for SD-25)
Bill Hager district 89 (term limited)
George Moraitis District 93 (term limited)
Manny Diaz Jr. District 103 (retiring ran for SD-36)
Carlos Trujillo District 105 (term limited, appointed U.S. Ambassador to the OAS)
Michael Bileca District 115 (term limited)
Jeannette Nuñez, District 119 (term limited, ran for Lt. Gov of FL)

Democrats 
Sean Shaw district 61 (retiring, ran for FL Att gen)
Janet Cruz district 62 (term limited, ran for SD 18)
Joseph Abruzzo district 81 (retiring)
Larry Lee Jr district 84 (retiring)
Lori Berman district 90 (retiring, ran for SD 31 special election)
Barrington Russell district 95 (retiring)
Katie Edwards-Walpole District 98 (retiring)
Cynthia Stafford district 100 (term limited)
David Richardson district 113 (retiring ran for CD-27)

References

Florida House of Representatives
Florida House of Representatives
Florida House of Representatives elections